Malverne Park Oaks is a hamlet and census-designated place (CDP) in the Town of Hempstead in Nassau County, on Long Island, in New York, United States. The population was 505 at the 2010 census.

History
The CDP was first created for the 2000 census.

While designated as one area, it is actually made up of three different, smaller communities: Malverne Park, Malverne Oaks South, and Malverne Oaks North.

When the Incorporated Village of Malverne was seeking to become an incorporated village in 1920, the residents from this area did not wish to become part of the new village and therefore remained a hamlet under the Town of Hempstead.

Geography

The Malverne Park section of the hamlet is more closely associated with the Village of Malverne as it falls within its fire and school districts as well as the Malverne ZIP code (11565).

The Malverne Oaks North and South sections of the hamlet, meanwhile, are linked more with West Hempstead for similar districting reasons and due to using a West Hempstead ZIP code (11552).

Demographics

As of the census of 2000, there were 470 people, 175 households, and 145 families residing in the CDP. The population density was 4,002.1 per square mile (1,512.2/km2). There were 175 housing units at an average density of 1,490.1/sq mi (563.1/km2). The racial makeup of the CDP was 90.64% White, 3.62% African American, 4.26% Asian, 1.28% from other races, and 0.21% from two or more races. Hispanic or Latino of any race were 7.45% of the population.

There were 175 households, out of which 34.3% had children under the age of 18 living with them, 72.0% were married couples living together, 8.0% had a female householder with no husband present, and 16.6% were non-families. 13.7% of all households were made up of individuals, and 8.6% had someone living alone who was 65 years of age or older. The average household size was 2.69 and the average family size was 2.94.

In the CDP, the population was spread out, with 22.8% under the age of 18, 4.5% from 18 to 24, 23.4% from 25 to 44, 30.2% from 45 to 64, and 19.1% who were 65 years of age or older. The median age was 45 years. For every 100 females, there were 92.6 males. For every 100 females age 18 and over, there were 87.1 males.

The median income for a household in the CDP was $91,208, and the median income for a family was $91,597. Males had a median income of $56,786 versus $31,250 for females. The per capita income for the CDP was $34,379. None of the population or families were below the poverty line.

Education 
Malverne Park Oaks is located within the boundaries of (and is thus served by) the Malverne Union Free School District and the West Hempstead Union Free School District. As such, children who reside within the hamlet and attend public schools go to school in one of these two districts, depending on where they reside within Malverne Park Oaks.

Transportation 
The Southern State Parkway travels through and serves the hamlet, along its northern border.

See also 

 North Lynbrook – another hamlet which remained unincorporated when Malverne chose to incorporate in 1921.

References

Hempstead, New York
Census-designated places in New York (state)
Census-designated places in Nassau County, New York